Penemue (deriv. from Heb. פְּנִימִי, penimi — "the inside") is a watcher in Enochian lore. He is a curer of stupidity in man, mentioned in Bereshith Rabba. As an angel associated with Abraxiel (Abraxas), Penemue was also likely of the order of healing angels called the Labbim.

See also
 Fallen angel
 List of angels in theology

References

Watchers (angels)